Socket 1, originally called the "OverDrive" socket, was the second of a series of standard CPU sockets created by Intel into which various x86 microprocessors were inserted. It was an upgrade to Intel's first standard 169-pin pin grid array (PGA) socket and the first with an official designation. Socket 1 was intended as a 486 upgrade socket, and added one extra pin to prevent upgrade chips from being inserted incorrectly.

Socket 1 was a 169-pin low insertion force (LIF) or zero insertion force (ZIF) 17×17 pin grid array (PGA) socket suitable for the 5-volt, 16 to 33 MHz 486 SX, 486 DX, 486 DX2 and 486 OverDrive processors.

See also
 List of Intel microprocessors

References

External links
 CPU Sockets Chart

Socket 001